Jeff Jenkins is an American producer known for his work in reality television. He is best known for producing The Simple Life, Total Divas, and Keeping Up with the Kardashians and its spinoffs.

Career

Bunim/Murray Productions
Jenkins started working at Bunim/Murray Productions in 2001 and helped grow and expand the company. He later served as executive vice president until August 2016. In August 2016, Jenkins was promoted to Co-President of Entertainment and Development the production company until he left Bunim/Murray Productions in November 2017.

At Bunim/Murray, Jenkins worked as an executive producer for Keeping Up with the Kardashians and its various spin-offs. Keeping Up with the Kardashians won multiple Teen Choice Awards, People's Choice Awards, and E! People's Choice Awards. Jenkins was a producer for Kourtney and Kim Take Miami, Kourtney and Kim Take New York, Khloé & Lamar, Dash Dolls, Rob & Chyna. Jenkins was a creator, producer, and writer for Kourtney and Khloé Take The Hamptons, which premiered in 2014. In 2015, Jenkins was an executive producer for I Am Cait, which covered Caitlyn Jenner's gender transition. The show was one of the most-watched unscripted series in 2015. In April 2016, the show tied with I Am Jazz for best Outstanding Reality Program at the 27th GLAAD Media Awards. In 2017, he was an executive producer for Life of Kylie.

Jeff Jenkins Productions
In 2018, Jenkins launched Jeff Jenkins Productions alongside 3 Ball Entertainment, which is based in Redondo Beach, California. Jeff Jenkins Productions is a full-service content and production company focusing on unscripted docuseries and celebrity-based reality television series.

In 2020, Jeff Jenkins Productions released Unfiltered: Paris Jackson & Gabriel Glenn on Facebook Watch. In 2021, Jenkins worked with Netflix to produce Bling Empire, which became one of the streaming service's most-watched docuseries at the time. The series was inspired by Crazy Rich Asians. The company is also producing My Unorthodox Life, which will follow Julia Haart, CEO of Elite World Group and former member of an ultra-Orthodox Jewish community.

Filmography

Television

References

External links

Living people
American male screenwriters
American television producers
American television writers
American male television writers
Television show creators
21st-century American screenwriters
21st-century American male writers
Year of birth missing (living people)